The 1992 Major League Baseball season saw the Toronto Blue Jays defeat the Atlanta Braves in the World Series, becoming the first team outside the United States to win the World Series.

A resurgence in pitching dominance occurred during this season. On average, one out of every seven games pitched this season was a shutout; in 2,106 MLB regular-season games, 298 shutouts were pitched (up from 272 in 2,104 regular-season games in 1991). Two teams pitched at least 20 shutouts each; the Atlanta Braves led the Majors with 24 and the Pittsburgh Pirates finished second with 20. In the National League, no team hit more than 138 home runs and no team scored 700 runs. The San Francisco Giants were shut out 18 times, the most in the Majors. The effect was similar in the American League. In 1991, two AL teams had scored at least 800 runs and three had collected 1,500 hits. In 1992, no team scored 800 runs and only one reached 1,500 hits. The California Angels were shut out 15 times, the most in the AL.

Awards and honors
Baseball Hall of Fame
Rollie Fingers
Bill McGowan
Hal Newhouser
Tom Seaver

Other awards
Outstanding Designated Hitter Award: Dave Winfield (TOR)
Roberto Clemente Award (Humanitarian):  Cal Ripken Jr. (BAL).
Rolaids Relief Man Award: Dennis Eckersley (OAK, American); Lee Smith (STL, National).

Player of the Month

Pitcher of the Month

Statistical leaders

Standings

American League

National League

Postseason

Bracket

Managers

American League

National League

Home Field Attendance & Payroll

Television coverage

Events

January–June
January 2 – The Boston Red Sox sign free agent pitcher Frank Viola.
January 7 – Pitchers Tom Seaver and Rollie Fingers are elected to the Baseball Hall of Fame by the Baseball Writers' Association of America. Seaver finishes with a record 98.8% of the votes cast. Pete Rose, ineligible because of his ban from baseball (otherwise this year would have been his first year of eligibility), receives 41 write–in votes.
January 31 – The Pittsburgh Pirates sign outfielder Barry Bonds to a one-year contract worth $4.7 million, the largest-ever one-year deal.
February 20 – The Simpsons episode Homer at the Bat airs on the Fox Network, featuring guest appearances by Roger Clemens, Wade Boggs, Ken Griffey Jr., Steve Sax, Ozzie Smith, José Canseco, Don Mattingly, Darryl Strawberry, and Mike Scioscia.
March 2 – Chicago Cubs second baseman Ryne Sandberg becomes the highest-paid player in major league history when he agrees to a four-year contract extension worth $28.4 million.
March 17 – Pitcher Hal Newhouser and umpire Bill McGowan are elected to the Baseball Hall of Fame by the Veterans Committee.
March 30 – In one of the biggest cross-town trades in Chicago baseball history, the Chicago Cubs trade George Bell to the Chicago White Sox, while the Sox send Sammy Sosa to the Cubs.
April 6 – A crowd of 44,568 sees the Baltimore Orioles defeat the Cleveland Indians 2–0 in the first game at Oriole Park at Camden Yards. Rick Sutcliffe hurls the shutout for Baltimore.
May 17 – The Minnesota Twins trade highly regarded pitching prospect Denny Neagle to the Pittsburgh Pirates for pitcher John Smiley.

July–December
July 7 – Andy Van Slyke of the Pittsburgh Pirates becomes the first outfielder in nearly 18 years to record an unassisted double play, in the Pirates' 5–3 win over the Houston Astros. Van Slyke races in from center field to catch a fly ball, then continues in to double up Ken Caminiti, who was running from second base on the play.
July 14 – The American League pounds out a record 19 hits in defeating the National League by a score of 13–6 in the All-Star Game. It is the AL's fifth straight win. Seattle Mariners outfielder Ken Griffey Jr., who hit a single, a double and a home run, is named the MVP, 12 years after his father Ken Sr. won the same honor.
August 28 – The Milwaukee Brewers lash 31 hits in a 22–2 drubbing of the Toronto Blue Jays, setting a record for the most hits by a team in a single nine-inning game. Darryl Hamilton leads the way for the Brewers, going 4-for-7 with 5 RBI.
September 7 – After receiving an 18–9 no-confidence vote from the owners, Commissioner Fay Vincent is forced to resign. Vincent is soon replaced by Milwaukee Brewers president Bud Selig on what is meant to be an interim basis.
September 9 – Robin Yount becomes the 17th player to reach 3,000 hits in the Milwaukee Brewers' 5–4 loss to the Cleveland Indians. Yount singles to right center off Cleveland's José Mesa in the seventh inning.
September 20 – Philadelphia Phillies second baseman Mickey Morandini completes the first unassisted triple play in the National League in 65 years against their in-state rivals, the Pittsburgh Pirates. In the bottom of the sixth inning, Morandini snares Jeff King's line drive, steps on second to double off Andy Van Slyke, and finally tags Barry Bonds out before he can return to first. It is the ninth unassisted triple play since 1901, but only the second to be pulled off by a second baseman.
September 23 – Bip Roberts of the Cincinnati Reds hits safely in his tenth consecutive at-bat. He ends his streak later in the game against the Los Angeles Dodgers.
September 26 – Bill Pecota becomes the first position player for the New York Mets to pitch in a game, giving up a home run in the 8th inning as the Pittsburgh Pirates defeat the Mets 19-2.
September 27 – The Pittsburgh Pirates seal their third consecutive National League East championship with a 4–2 victory over the New York Mets.
September 28 – The idle Oakland Athletics clinch their fourth American League West crown in five years when the second-place Minnesota Twins fall to the Chicago White Sox 9–4.
September 29 – The Atlanta Braves wrap up the National League West with a 6–0 shutout of the San Francisco Giants.
September 30 – George Brett of the Kansas City Royals collects his 3,000th hit, an infield single off Tim Fortugno in the seventh inning of a 4–0 Royals victory over the California Angels.
October 3 – The Toronto Blue Jays clinch their second straight American League East title with a 3–1 win over the Detroit Tigers.
October 23 – The expansion Florida Marlins hire Rene Lachemann as the team's first manager.
October 24 – The Toronto Blue Jays clinch their first World Series championship with a 4–3 win over the Atlanta Braves in Game 6. Dave Winfield's 2–out, 2–run double in the top of the 11th gives Toronto a 4–2 lead. The Braves score one run in the bottom half of the inning and have the tying run on 3rd when the final out is made. Jimmy Key wins the game in relief, and Candy Maldonado homers for Toronto. Blue Jays catcher Pat Borders, with a .450 batting average, is named the Series MVP. The Toronto Blue Jays finish the season without being swept in any series. They are the first team from outside the United States to win the World Series.
October 27 – The expansion Colorado Rockies hire Don Baylor as the team's first manager.
November 10 – In a 9–4 vote, the National League fails to get enough yes votes to approve a sale of the San Francisco Giants to Vince Naimoli, which would have resulted in a move of the team to St. Petersburg, Florida.
November 10 - The Seattle Mariners hire Lou Piniella as their new manager.
November 16 – The Rockies sign free agent first baseman Andrés Galarraga, who rejoins Don Baylor, his hitting coach with the St. Louis Cardinals. Galarraga is coming off his second injury-plagued year, having missed 44 days of the season after being hit on the wrist by a Wally Whitehurst pitch in the 3rd game of the season.
November 17 – Major League Baseball holds an expansion draft to stock the rosters of the National League's two new teams, the Florida Marlins and Colorado Rockies. A total of 72 players are chosen. The best picks for Florida are Trevor Hoffman, eventually packaged for Gary Sheffield; Jeff Conine, and Cris Carpenter, later dealt to the Texas Rangers for Robb Nen. For Colorado, their best picks are Eric Young, Joe Girardi, Vinny Castilla, Armando Reynoso, Andy Ashby, Brad Ausmus, Charlie Hayes and Doug Bochtler. The next season, Ashby, Ausmus and Bochtler will go to the San Diego Padres in an ill-fated deal for pricey veteran pitchers Bruce Hurst and Greg Harris.

Movies
A League of Their Own

References

External links
1992 Major League Baseball season schedule at Baseball Reference

 
Major League Baseball seasons